A gubernatorial election was held on 30 April 1951 to elect the Governor of Hokkaido Prefecture.

Candidates
Toshibumi Tanaka – incumbent governor of Hokkaido Prefecture, age 39.
 – nicknamed "Father of Japanese Dairy", age 66.

Results

References

Hokkaido gubernational elections
1951 elections in Japan